is the second full-length studio album by Japanese Idol unit 3776 (Minanaro), released on August 28, 2019.

Before releasing this, 3776 had some songs about the four seasons in Japan. Producer Akira Ishida mixed these songs with some Japanese traditional children's songs and made the album like "DJ mix". Throughout the album, main performer Chiyono Ide counts 365 days from January to December and 12 koku (Japanese old hour system). The title of each song means the month, the measure of rhythm, the tonality.

Reception
A famous Japanese rapper Utamaru described this album as saying, "It's no wonder to be able to get a global reputation."

Live Performance
On August 15, 2019, 3776 had live based on this album. Akira Ishida played DJ, and Chiyono Ide sang and danced. Throughout the live, recorded voices counting 365 days from August 15 was playing.

Related product
On September 24, 2019, the product related to this album,  was released.

Track listing
All tracks composed by Akira Ishida mixed with traditional songs.

Personnel
Chiyono Ide - vocals
Akira Ishida - guitars, programming, etc.

References

External links
 3776 - 歳時記 (2019, CD) at Discogs

2019 albums
Art pop albums
Pop albums by Japanese artists
Alternative rock albums by Japanese artists
Progressive rock albums by Japanese artists
Experimental pop albums